The buff-cheeked tody-flycatcher (Poecilotriccus senex) is a species of bird in the family Tyrannidae. It is endemic to Brazil. Its natural habitat is subtropical or tropical swamps.

References

buff-cheeked tody-flycatcher
Birds of the Amazon Basin
Endemic birds of Brazil
buff-cheeked tody-flycatcher
Taxonomy articles created by Polbot